Andreas M. Lervik (born 28 November 1969) is a Norwegian politician for the Labour Party.

He served as a deputy representative to the Norwegian Parliament from Østfold during the terms 2001–2005 and 2005–2009. (He was then a member of the Socialist Left Party.)

He has been a member of Sarpsborg municipal council 1995-2003 and of Østfold county council since 1999.

He has had many different positions and he is currently Chair of the Østfold county councils committee for Commerce, Trade and Culture.
He is also Deputy Chair of the Labour partys county council group. 
Lervik has been working with international questions for several years and is currently Vice President for North Sea Commission.

References

 
 Andreas M Lervik archived

1969 births
Living people
Deputy members of the Storting
Labour Party (Norway) politicians
Østfold politicians
People from Sarpsborg